Sir Thomas Temple, 1st Baronet of Nova Scotia (1613/14–1674 ) was a British proprietor and governor of Acadia/Nova Scotia.

Thomas Temple may also refer to:
 Thomas Temple (Canadian politician) (1818–1899), Canadian member of parliament and senator from New Brunswick
 Sir Thomas Temple, 1st Baronet, of Stowe (1567–1637), English landowner and Member of Parliament
 Thomas Temple, Jamaica, first owner of Temple Hall, Jamaica c. 1670